The B4 class were 4-4-0 steam locomotives for express passenger work on the London, Brighton and South Coast Railway. They were designed by R. J. Billinton and were either built at Brighton works 1899–1902 or else by Messrs Sharp, Stewart and Company in 1901. Twelve members of the class were rebuilt from 1922 to 1924 by L. B. Billinton with a larger boiler, cylinders and a superheater. The rebuilt locomotives were classified B4X.

Construction

The performance of Robert Billinton's B2 class 4-4-0 locomotives of 1895–1897 had proved to be disappointing and they had not been able to replace the earlier Stroudley's B1 class 0-4-2 on the heaviest London to Brighton express trains. Billinton therefore sought authority for the construction of twenty-five larger and more powerful 4-4-0 B4 class locomotives. The first two of these, Nos. 52 and 53, were completed at Brighton works between December 1899 and January 1900, both of which performed well and demonstrated that the new design was sound. However, during the spring of 1900 a backlog of repair work at Brighton meant that the third (No. 54) was not completed until May 1900. The railway therefore approached Sharp, Stewart and Company to supply twenty-five further examples over the next twelve months. These were all delivered between June and October 1901. By 1901 Brighton had overcome the backlog of repair work and five further locomotive boilers were ordered from Sharp, Stewart and Company to be used on additional locomotives to be built at Brighton between June and September 1902.

Use
The B4 class successfully hauled the heaviest express trains on the London, Brighton and South Coast Railway until around 1912 when they were gradually replaced by the larger H1, H2, J1 and J2 classes. Thereafter they were regularly used on slower and lighter services. According to O. S. Nock, the B4 class "were among the finest passenger locomotives of their day".

Rebuilds

In 1918, No. 46 was rebuilt by Lawson Billinton with a new boiler including a Robinson superheater. Unfortunately the resulting locomotive was not tested before Billinton decided to rebuild other members of the class, using his K class superheated boiler. The rebuilt locomotives were classified B4X. However, since the original frames could not be used (as the K class firebox was too long to fit between the axles, new frames, new piston valve cylinders), they were virtually new engines. Unfortunately the original motion and motion plate was retained to save costs, which meant that the piston valves were in the constricted space below the cylinders at an angle to the axis of the cylinders. Only 8 inch-diameter valves could be fitted in, and combined with the restricted exhaust arrangement ensured that they were unable to use the steam available from the excellent K class boiler. 

Acceleration from stops was very leisurely and they could only be coaxed up to  while newly outshopped, with great difficulty in places, where the Atlantics, J class and Baltics could reach . Twelve members of the class were 'rebuilt' between August 1922 and January 1924, but further modifications were deferred by Richard Maunsell of the Southern Railway when it became apparent that their performance was not satisfactory. Harold Holcroft found, when he was tasked by Maunsell to report on the post grouping loco stock, that class B4x were very expensive compared to the SECR rebuilds (D1/E1) and far less competent. It was to be 1929 before their services on express work could be dispensed with. Henceforth the class was deployed on secondary duties.

The B4 and B4x classes continued with secondary duties, but thirteen members of the class were withdrawn between 1934 and 1939. The remainder would have followed soon after if World War II had not brought about a temporary reprieve. Six B4s and twelve B4Xs passed to British Railways in 1948. All had been withdrawn by 1951, and none were preserved.

Locomotive summary

References

External links 

 Rail UK database, B4
 Rail UK database, B4X
 LB&SCR online, B4 class

4-4-0 locomotives
B4
Sharp Stewart locomotives
Railway locomotives introduced in 1899
Standard gauge steam locomotives of Great Britain
Scrapped locomotives